Excelan was a computer networking company founded in 1982 by Kanwal Rekhi, Inder Singh and Navindra Jain. Excelan was a manufacturer of smart Ethernet cards, until the company merged with, and was acquired by Novell in 1989. The company offered a line of Ethernet "front end processor" boards for Multibus, VMEbus, Q-Bus, Unibus, and IBM AT Bus systems. The cards were equipped with their own processor and memory, and ran TCP/IP protocol software that was downloaded onto the cards from the host system. Excelan offered software like LAN Workplace that integrated the cards into a variety of operating system environments, including many flavors of UNIX, RSX-11, VMS, and DOS. The hardware and software were sold under the EXOS brand. In 1987, Excelan also acquired Kinetics, a small networking company that manufactured and sold a variety of Ethernet networking products for Apple Macintosh environments, most notably an AppleTalk-to-Ethernet gateway called the FastPath. 

Excelan also manufactured and sold Ethernet network analyzer products, the first being the Excelan Nutcracker, followed later by the Excelan LANalyzer.

See also
 Novell LAN WorkPlace for DOS

References

Companies based in San Jose, California
Companies established in 1982
Networking companies
Networking companies of the United States
Networking hardware companies
1982 establishments in California